The 2001 Northern Ford Premiership season was the second tier of British rugby league during the 2001 season. The competition featured nineteen teams, with Widnes Vikings winning the Grand Final.

Championship
The league was won by Widnes Vikings, who beat Oldham in the Grand Final. The League Leaders Leigh Centurions lost in the play-off semi-finals. Widnes Vikings were promoted to the Super League.

League table

Play-offs

Week 1
Dewsbury Rams 6–19 Hull Kingston Rovers

Featherstone Rovers 28–24 Keighley Cougars

Leigh Centurions 14–15 Oldham

Widnes Vikings 34–24 Rochdale Hornets

Week 2
Leigh Centurions 26–10 Featherstone Rovers

Rochdale Hornets 26–14 Hull Kingston Rovers

Week 3
Leigh Centurions 18–26 Widnes Vikings

Oldham 39–32 Rochdale Hornets

Grand Final

See also
2001 Challenge Cup

References

External links
2001 season at wigan.rlfans.com

Rugby Football League Championship
Northern Ford Premiership